Natalie Wideman (born January 11, 1992) is a Canadian softball player.

Career
Wideman competed at the 2015 Pan American Games in Toronto, winning the gold medal, and again at the 2019 Pan American Games in Lima, winning silver. 

In June 2021, Wideman was named to Canada's 2020 Olympic team.

References

External links
 California Vulcans bio

1992 births
Living people
California Vulcans softball players
Canadian softball players
Canadian expatriate sportspeople in the United States
Competitors at the 2022 World Games
Sportspeople from Mississauga
Softball players at the 2015 Pan American Games
Softball players at the 2019 Pan American Games
Medalists at the 2015 Pan American Games
Medalists at the 2019 Pan American Games
Pan American Games gold medalists for Canada
Pan American Games silver medalists for Canada
Medalists at the 2020 Summer Olympics
Olympic softball players of Canada
Olympic bronze medalists for Canada
Olympic medalists in softball
Softball players at the 2020 Summer Olympics
Pan American Games medalists in softball